Uchee Creek may refer to:

Uchee Creek (Alabama)
Uchee Creek (Georgia)